David Benoit may refer to:
David Benoit (actor) (born 1966), American actor and singer
David Benoit (basketball) (born 1968), former American basketball player
David Benoit (musician) (born 1953), American jazz pianist
David Michael Benoit (born 1993), American wrestler son of Chris Benoit with 1st wife Martina

See also
Benoît David (born 1966), Canadian rock singer